Peter Edwards may refer to:

 Peter Edwards (vexillologist) (1931–2019), Canadian vexillologist
 Peter Edwards (artist) (born 1955), British painter
 Peter Edwards (rugby league) (born 1969), New Zealand former professional rugby league footballer
 Peter Edwards (rugby union) (born 1980), English rugby union player
 Peter Edwards (chemist) (born 1949), British scientist
 Peter Edwards (historian) (born 1945), Australian diplomatic and military historian
 Peter Edwards (rower) (born 1939), Australian Olympic rower
 Peter Edwards (pianist), British pianist, composer and band leader

See also
 Edward Peters (disambiguation)